Robert Dessaix (born 17 February 1944) is an Australian novelist, essayist and journalist.

Biography 
Robert Dessaix was born in Sydney and adopted at an early age by Tom and Jean Jones, after which he was known as Robert Jones.  Tom Jones, a merchant seaman, was already 55 when Robert was adopted.  Robert was educated at North Sydney Boys High School and the Australian National University. He married in 1970.  He studied at Moscow State University during the early 1970s, and taught Russian Studies at the Australian National University and the University of New South Wales from 1972 to 1984. During this time he translated a number of Russian books into English in collaboration with Michael Ulman, including The Sheepskin Coat and An Absolutely Happy Village by Boris Vakhtin.

Robert Jones resumed his birth name Robert Dessaix after he was awarded his doctorate.

From 1985 to 1995 he presented the ABC program Books and Writing.

His first book was his autobiography, A Mother's Disgrace, which was published in 1994 by HarperCollins. Manuscripts concerning A Mother's Disgrace are in the Mitchell Library of the State Library of New South Wales. The manuscript was written in French, and the book concerns his journey to an alternative sexuality after twelve years of marriage and his meeting with his birth mother Yvonne. It was made into a screenplay by Ross Wilson in 1999.  He never met his birth father, who was killed in an air crash shortly after the end of World War II.

His first fictional work, the epistolary novel Night Letters, was published in 1996. It was translated into German, French, Italian, Dutch, Finnish, Polish, and Portuguese.

His second novel was Corfu, published in 2001.

Dessaix's latest long work, Twilight of Love: Travels with Turgenev defies genre characterisation, interweaving a personal travelogue with a biography of Ivan Turgenev. It was published in 2004. It takes inspiration from his doctoral thesis on Turgenev and the Soviet Union, as well as Alain de Botton's works on travel, art and philosophy.

In March 2010 it was revealed that Dessaix had been refused a visa to attend the Shanghai International Literary Festival. He had declared his HIV-positive status on his application, and although the guidelines stated that HIV status would have no prejudicial effect, it was felt that it must have been the reason for the refusal because Dessaix had had no political involvement in matters concerning China.

The State Library of NSW holds an extensive collection of material related to Dessaix including his papers concerning the writing of Night Letters.

Bibliography

Novels 
 Night Letters: A Journey Through Switzerland and Italy Edited and Annotated by Igor Miazmov (1996) 
 Secrets (with Drusilla Modjeska and Amanda Lohrey, 1997) 
 Corfu (2001)

Autobiography 
 A Mother's Disgrace (1994) 
 Arabesques : A Tale of Double Lives  (2008) 
 What days are for (2014)

Non-fiction 
 (and so forth) (1998) 
 Twilight of Love: Travels with Turgenev  (2004) 
 As I Was Saying: A Collection of Musings (2012) 
  Arabesques: A Tale of Double Lives 
 The Pleasures of Leisure (2017) 
 The Time of Our Lives: Growing Older Well (2020)

Edited 
 Australian Gay and Lesbian Writing: An Anthology (1993) 
 Picador New Writing (1993) 
 Speaking Their Minds: Intellectuals and the Public Culture in Australia (1998) 
 The Best Australian Essays 2004 (2004) 
 The Best Australian Essays 2005 (2005)

Awards and nominations 
 NBC Banjo Awards, NBC Banjo Award for Non-Fiction, 1994: A Mother's Disgrace - shortlisted
 Booksellers Choice Award, 1996: Night Letters : A Journey Through Switzerland and Italy Edited and Annotated by Igor Miazmov - joint winner
 Australian Literature Society Gold Medal, 1997: Night Letters: A Journey Through Switzerland and Italy Edited and Annotated by Igor Miazmov - winner
 Colin Roderick Award, 1998: (And So Forth) - winner
 Waverley Library Award for Literature, 2005: Twilight of Love: Travels with Turgenev - shortlisted
 Victorian Premier's Literary Award, The Nettie Palmer Prize for Non-Fiction, 2005: Twilight of Love: Travels with Turgenev - winner
 New South Wales Premier's Literary Awards, Douglas Stewart Prize for Non-Fiction, 2005: Twilight of Love : Travels with Turgenev - shortlisted
 Margaret Scott Prize, 2007: Twilight of Love : Travels with Turgenev - winner
 Australia Council Award for Lifetime Achievement in Literature, 2022

Appearances 
Robert Dessaix was on the program to appear in an event at the 2017 Brisbane Writers Festival in Brisbane, Queensland. Dessaix's "The Pleasures of Leisure" appeared in the New South Wales Higher School Certificate English Examination on 18 October 2018. In the form of an edited nonfiction extract, it served as the last of three "unseen" texts in Section I of the first paper. The paper was taken by students of the English (Standard) and English (Advanced) HSC Courses studying the common "Discovery" module prescribed by the NSW Education Standards Authority (formerly known as the Board of Studies, Teaching and Educational Standards NSW).

References

External links 
 
  Transcript of interview with Ramona Koval about "Arabesques" on The Book Show on ABC Radio National, 7 October 2008.
 Robert Dessaix's Australian Literary Management page 
 Literary Encyclopedia entry on Robert Dessaix
 A profile and bibliography from the Brisbane Writers Festival 2004 including his sessions there
 Mitchell Library Collection of the Papers of Robert Dessaix's A Mother's Disgrace
 Mitchell Library Collection of the Papers of Robert Dessaix's Night Letters
 An Interview with Robert Dessaix by Jayne Margetts
 Lingua Franca interview with Dessaix about his personal language K
 Interview with Dessaix by Phil Lecks
 Guardian Review of Twilight of Love: Travels with Turgenev
 His best second self - review from the Telegraph of Twilight of Love
 Robert Dessaix - public intellectuals in Australia':interview with Phillip Adams, Late Night Live, ABC Radio National

1944 births
Living people
20th-century Australian novelists
20th-century Australian male writers
21st-century Australian novelists
Australian male novelists
Writers from Sydney
LGBT memoirists
People educated at North Sydney Boys High School
Australian LGBT novelists
ALS Gold Medal winners
21st-century Australian male writers
Journalists from Sydney